Tom Lloyd (1929–1996) was an American sculptor, activist and community organizer.

Early life and education
Tom Lloyd was born in Jamaica, Queens in 1929. He studied art at the Pratt Institute in Brooklyn and the Brooklyn Museum.

Artistic career 
In 1968, Tom Lloyd’s work was chosen as the subject for the inaugural exhibition of the Studio Museum in Harlem. The exhibition, Electronic Refractions II, opened on September 24, 1968, and featured his electronically programmed light sculptures. Lloyd’s work in the exhibition proved controversial, departing as it did from a figurative aesthetic prevalent in African-American art at the time.

A few months before the opening, Lloyd participated in the 1968 round-table discussion The Black Artist in America: A Symposium, convened at the Metropolitan Museum of Art and chaired by Romare Bearden. The discussion included Richard Hunt, Jacob Lawrence, Hale Woodruff, Sam Gilliam and William T. Williams.

In 1971, Lloyd edited a volume of commissioned essays written by African-American cultural producers called Black Art Notes, to which he also contributed. In his essay he addressed the need for a relationship between art and social and political action. The publication as a whole was intended as a “counter-statement” to Robert Doty’s catalog introduction of the Contemporary Black Artists in America exhibition held at the Whitney Museum in 1971.

Also in 1971, Lloyd founded the Store Front Museum in Queens, NY. Located in the predominantly Black neighborhood of Jamaica, the space served as a vital cultural hub hosting exhibitions, concerts, lectures and festivals as well as other community enrichment activities like dance and karate lessons.

Political activism 
Lloyd was a founding member of the Art Workers Coalition, and initially, the only Black artist. He was instrumental in recruiting Faith Ringgold into the group and together with John Hendricks and others, used the group as a platform to advocate for integrating museums through the creation of Black and Puerto Rican advisory boards and through acquiring and holding more exhibitions of Black and Puerto Rican artists' work. Before joining the AWC, Lloyd briefly joined the Black Emergency Cultural Coalition (BECC), but found their approach to social change too meek.

Selected exhibitions 
1965, Amel Gallery

1965, Art Turned On, Institute of Contemporary Art, Boston

1965, Light as a Creative Medium, Carpenter Art Center, Harvard University

1966, Light in Art, Contemporary Arts Museum Houston

1966, Art Electric, Sonnabend Gallery, Paris

1966, Wadsworth Atheneum, Hartford, Connecticut

1967, Counterpoints, Lever House, New York

1968, Howard Wise Gallery

1971, Electronic Refractions II, Studio Museum in Harlem, New York

1971, Contemporary Black Artists in America, Whitney Museum of American Art  

2006, Energy/Experimentation, Studio Museum in Harlem, New York

2007, Black Light White Noise, Contemporary Arts Museum Houston

2019, Black Refractions: Highlights from the Studio Museum in Harlem, traveling exhibition

Further reading 

 Bearden, Romare, Sam Gilliam, Richard Hunt, Jacob Lawrence, Tom Lloyd, William Williams, and Hale Woodruff. "The Black Artist in America: A Symposium." The Metropolitan Museum of Art Bulletin 27, no. 5 (1969): 245–61. 
Cahan, Susah E. Mounting Frustration: The Art Museum in the Age of Black Power. Durham: Duke University Press, 2016. . OCLC 994318514 
English, Darby. 1971: A Year in the Life of Color. Chicago: University of Chicago Press, 2016. . OCLC 944087514.  
Godfrey Mark and Zoe Whitley, eds. Soul of a Nation: Art in the Age of Black Power. London: Tate, 2017. ISBN 978184764636. OCLC 972385518

References

External links 
 Tom Lloyd audio interview on Electronic Refractions II at the Studio Museum in Harlem, recorded December 11, 1968

1929 births
African-American sculptors
African-American contemporary artists
American contemporary artists
Light artists
20th-century American sculptors
20th-century American male artists
Activists for African-American civil rights
Living people
20th-century African-American artists
21st-century African-American people